The Symphony No. 6 in C major, D 589, is a symphony by Franz Schubert composed between October 1817 and February 1818.  Its first public performance was in Vienna in 1828.  It is nicknamed the "Little C major" to distinguish it from his later Ninth Symphony, in the same key, which is known as the "Great C major".

Instrumentation
The symphony is scored for two flutes, two oboes, two clarinets (in C), two bassoons, two horns (in C), two trumpets (in C), timpani (in C and G) and strings.

Movements

There are four movements:

A typical performance lasts around 32 minutes.

References

External links
 

No. 06
1818 compositions
Compositions in C major